Lyftingen Peak is a peak just southeast of the Kjølrabbane Hills, near the southwest end of Ahlmann Ridge in Queen Maud Land, Antarctica. It was mapped and named by Norwegian cartographers from surveys and air photos by the Norwegian–British–Swedish Antarctic Expedition (1949–52).

References

Mountains of Queen Maud Land
Princess Martha Coast